In the Russian political lexicon, a silovik (plural: siloviki) is a person who works in the Russian Armed Forces, the Russian national police, Russian national drug control, Russian immigration control (GUVM), the Ministry of Justice, FSB political police, former KGB, GRU, the Foreign Intelligence Service (SVR), the Federal Protective Service (FSO) and any other state organisation that is authorised to use force against people. This word is also used for a politician who came into politics from these organisations.

Siloviki is also used as a collective noun to designate all troops and officers of all law enforcement agencies of post-Soviet countries, not necessarily high-ranking ones.

Etymology 
The term siloviki ('siloviks') is literally translated as "people of force" or "strongmen" (from Russian сила, "force"). It originated from the phrase "institutions of force", which appeared in the early Boris Yeltsin era (early 1990s) to denote the military-style uniformed services, including the military proper, the police (Ministry of Internal Affairs), national security (FSB) organizations and some other structures.

A similar term is "securocrat" (law enforcement and intelligence officer). Daniel Treisman in turn proposed a term "silovarch" (silovik and oligarch).

Description 
Siloviki often wish to encourage a view that they might be seen in Russia as being generally non-ideological, with a pragmatic law-and-order focus and Russian national interests at heart. They are generally well educated and bring past commercial experience to their government posts. It is assumed that siloviki have a natural preference for the reemergence of a strong Russian state.

The siloviki do not form a cohesive group. They do not have a single leader and there is no common, articulated "silovik agenda". However, according to John P. Willerton, these security-intelligence officials brought the work ethic and skills—that Putin apparently favoured—to the administration.

A former KGB general said that "a Chekist is a breed... A good KGB heritage—a father or grandfather, say, who worked for the service—is highly valued by today's siloviki. Marriages between siloviki clans are also encouraged."

Persons and positions 

Senior siloviki under the presidency of Vladimir Putin included Sergei Ivanov, Viktor Ivanov, Sergei Shoigu, Igor Sechin, Nikolai Patrushev, Alexander Bortnikov and Sergey Naryshkin who had close working relationships with Putin and held key positions in Putin's governments. Willerton points out, however, that it is difficult to assess if their common security-intelligence background translates into common political preferences.

Following the 2011 Russian protests, Russian president Dmitri Medvedev, having made promises of political reform, nevertheless appointed several siloviki to prominent positions in the government: Sergei Ivanov to chief of staff of the presidential administration; Dmitry Rogozin to deputy prime minister; and Vyacheslav Volodin to deputy chief of staff.

Putin's chief national security adviser, Nikolai Patrushev, who believed that the West has been in an undeclared war with Russia for years, was a leading figure behind Russia's updated national security strategy, published in May 2021. It stated that Russia may use "forceful methods" to "thwart or avert unfriendly actions that threaten the sovereignty and territorial integrity of the Russian Federation".

See also 
 Putinism
 Deep state
 Police state
 Chekism
 Counterintelligence state
 Military junta
 National security state
 Russia under Vladimir Putin
 Political groups under Vladimir Putin's presidency

References

Further reading 
 Brian D. Taylor. (2017). The Russian Siloviki and Political Change. Daedalus (journal).
 
 Routledge Handbook of Russian Politics and Society

External links 
 William Safire on the Siloviki
 "The Siloviki in Putin's Russia: Who They Are and What They Want", The Washington Quarterly, Winter 2007
 The Exile on Russia's brewing "Silovik war"
 "Russian ex-spies flex their muscles", BBC News

Politics of Russia
Russian words and phrases